Théâtre français de Toronto (TfT) is a French-language theatre company presenting repertoire as well as original works in Ontario, Canada since 1967. Shows have been performed at the Berkeley Street Theatre since 1990. The company is a registered charity with the Canadian Revenue Agency since 1979.

History 
The company was founded in 1967 under the name Théâtre du P’tit Bonheur, the title of its first production. The Toronto-based francophone company appointed an artistic director, John Van Burek in 1970; it also began a collaboration with the Québécois author Michel Tremblay. In 1987, the company was renamed Théâtre français de Toronto. In 1992 Diana Leblanc became the company's artistic director. In 1997, Guy Mignault took over the role; his production of the musical C’était un p’tit Bonheur won a Dora award in 1998. In 2016, Joël Beddows became the TfT's new artistic director.

In 2004, the company began participating in the educational program Les Zurbains, an initiative of Théâtre Le Clou from Montréal that ran a writing contest for students from Ottawa, Québec City, Montréal, and Toronto.

In 2005, the company began offering performances with English surtitles.

The company's 2006 production of Molière's  L’Avare won the Masque award for Best Franco-Canadian Production.
The company's 40th anniversary celebrations in 2007 were presided over by Governor General Michaëlle Jean. A year later, in December 2008, the Centre for Creation, a general working space for the company, was set up.

Their 2009 show Une Maison face au nord by Jean-Rock Gaudreault, a co-production with Québec companies Tandem and La Rubrique, was dubbed the "Canadian Play of the Year" by EYE WEEKLY magazine.

The 2009-2010 season saw the beginning of a collaboration with Ottawa’s
Théâtre La Catapulte. This agreement, called "Five Years of Theatre," was intended to establish networks for francophone theatre in Ontario. This collaboration included a production of Les Médecins de Molière in 2010 which won 4 Prix Rideau Awards including Best Production of the Year, and Zone by Marcel Dubé in 2012 which won 3 Prix Rideau Awards including another Best Production of the Year and a second Best Production

In 2011, the company launched an educational project, Les
Zinspirés. Inspired by the initial project Les Zurbains, it began
with a writing competition in French schools and eventually led to a
professional show featuring 5 stories written by local teens. The first and third edition of Les Zinspirés, produced in 2012 and 2014 respectively, were nominated for Dora Mavor Moore Awards for Outstanding New Play and Outstanding Performance by an Ensemble. The same year, the company began offering Drama classes for children led by Jean-Michel Le Gal.

References

Theatre companies in Toronto